Eulyes amoena is a species of true assassin bugs belonging to the family Reduviidae.

Description
Eulyes amoena shows a warningly black and red coloration. The black and red larva of these stinking bugs are mimicked the larva of a Bornean mantid.

Distribution
This species is widespread in Indonesia (Borneo, Sumatra and Java).

References

 Maldonado Capriles J. (1990): Catalogue of the Reduviidae of the World, Caribbean Journal of Science, University of Puerto Rico

External links
 An image of a live individual in Flickr.com

Reduviidae
Hemiptera of Asia
Insects described in 1838